Bresse Vallons is a commune in the Ain department in eastern France. It is the result of the merger, on 1 January 2019, of the communes of Cras-sur-Reyssouze and Étrez.

Population

See also
Communes of the Ain department

References

Communes of Ain
Communes nouvelles of Ain
Populated places established in 2019
2019 establishments in France
Bresse